David Merrifield is a Canadian retired ice hockey Center who was an All-American for North Dakota and helped the team win the 1963 NCAA Tournament.

Career
Merrifield was a three-year starter for North Dakota beginning in 1960. In his sophomore and junior seasons, the Fighting Sioux were a fairly poor team, missing the conference tournament both seasons. In his senior year, however, both the defense and offense vastly improved and UND tied Denver for the regular season championship. Merrifield was second on the team with 51 points and was named as both a All-WCHA First Teamer and an All-American. After the Fighting Sioux finished as runner-up for the WCHA Tournament the team set its sights on the National Championship. After easily dispatching Boston College in the semifinal, UND roared out to an early lead in the championship game. Merrifield assisted on two of the Sioux's 5 first period goals and the early lead enabled UND to hold on despite a furious surge from Denver at the end, winning the match 6–5. Merrifield was named to All-Tournament First Team

After graduating, Merrifield joined the Canadian National Team in the run up to the 1964 Winter Olympics. He was one of four players who remained with the squad but did not participate in any of the games. Merrifield retired after the 1964 season.

Career statistics

Regular season and playoffs

Awards and honors

References

External links

1941 births
Living people
Canadian ice hockey centres
Ice hockey people from Ontario
Sportspeople from Thunder Bay
North Dakota Fighting Hawks men's ice hockey players
NCAA men's ice hockey national champions
AHCA Division I men's ice hockey All-Americans